The Mélantois is an inland area of northern France, at south-east of Lille. Between the Deûle and the Marque, it is bounded to the north by a line from Willems to La Madeleine.

References 

Nord (French department)